The Lohit River, which name came from the Assamese word Lohit meaning blood, also known as the Zayul Chu by the Tibetans and Tellu by the Mishmis, is a river in China and India, which joins the Brahmaputra River in the state of Assam.  It is formed in the Zayul County of the Tibet Autonomous Region, through a merger of two rivers: the Kangri Karpo Chu (also called Rongto Chu and Zayul Ngu Chu), which originates in the Kangri Karpo range, and Zayul Chu, which originates to its northeast.  The two rivers merge below the town of Rima. The combined river  descends through this mountainous region and surges through Arunachal Pradesh in India for  before entering the plains of Assam where it is known as the Lohit River. Tempestuous and turbulent, and known as the river of blood partly attributable to the lateritic soil, it flows through the Mishmi Hills, to meet the Siang (Brahmaputra) at the head of the Brahmaputra valley.

Course 

Thickly forested for the most part, alpine vegetation gives way to subtropical forests, and then to some of the densest tropical jungles in all of India. Rhododendrons bloom in many hues in the upper reaches, orchids reveal themselves in the lower groves. This is indeed a treasure house of medicinal plant and herbs, and the home of Mishmi teeta, the coptis plant, prized the world over for its medicinal properties.

The Mishmis hold sway in the hills. In the plains are the Khamptis and the Singphos, fervent Buddhists and migrants from across the Patkai hills from Burma. As the Lohit journeys through, Tibetan theology gives way to animist belief, in turn replaced by Theravada Buddhism and then by Hindu temples.  This region experiences a mix of many cultures near the tripoint between Tibet, Southeast Asia, and South Asia.

The Lohit river comes into India from China and flows near India's easternmost inhabited tip, at a place called Kibithu. The Indian Army uses this river for various expeditions and training.

The Dhola–Sadiya Bridge, also referred to as the Bhupen Hazarika Setu, is a beam bridge and longest in India, connecting the northeast states of Assam and Arunachal Pradesh. The bridge spans the Lohit River, from the village of Dhola in the south to Sadiya to the north.

River rafting
There have been very few raft expeditions on the Lohit River. It is a medium volume continuous Class 4+/5 river in its upper alpine reaches and becomes pool drop towards the latter end of the trip. Rafting was first started in February 1994 by the Indian Army and  the first successful kayak descent of the river in December 2003.

Parshuram Kund, a Hindu pilgrimage is situated on the lower reaches of Lohit. Over 70,000 devotees and sadhus take holy dip its water each year on the occasion of Makar Sankranti, in the month of January.

See also
 Zayü County (in Tibet)
 Dhola–Sadiya Bridge

References

External links

Report Assam Floods 16 Jun 2006 - Lohit
Lohit River marked on OpenStreetMap

Rivers of Arunachal Pradesh
Tributaries of the Brahmaputra River
Rivers of India
Rivers of Tibet
Rivers of Assam